Mel Greenberg (born April 16, 1947) is an American sports journalist focusing on women's basketball.

Since 1970, Greenberg has written for The Philadelphia Inquirer, where he predominantly covers college and professional women's basketball. He has helped pioneer national coverage of the sport, most notably as a leader in organizing the first Top 25 women's college basketball poll. For this and other accomplishments, he has been called "The Guru" of women's basketball.

In 1991, Greenberg received the first media award from the Women's Basketball Coaches Association, an award that has since been named after him. The annual Mel Greenberg Media Award is given to "a member of the media who has best displayed a commitment to women's basketball and to advancing the role of the media in promoting the women's game". Subsequent winners include Debbie Becker of USA Today in 1992, Mary Garber of the Winston-Salem Journal in 1998, and Bill Jauss of the Chicago Tribune in 2006.

In 2007 Greenberg was inducted into the Women's Basketball Hall of Fame.

External links
Women's Hoops Blogspot
Women's Basketball Coaches Association
Women's Basketball Hall of Fame

Notes 

Living people
Basketball mass media
Writers from Philadelphia
1947 births
Journalists from Pennsylvania
Sportswriters from Pennsylvania